Nasdaq Stockholm, formerly known as the Stockholm Stock Exchange, is a stock exchange located in Frihamnen, Stockholm, Sweden.  Founded in 1863, it has become the primary securities exchange of the Nordic countries. As of March 2021, a total of 832 companies are listed on Nasdaq Stockholm with 385 companies on the main market and additional 447 listed on secondary markets (Nasdaq First North and Nasdaq First North Premier).

History
The Stockholm Stock Exchange was acquired by futures exchange OM in 1998. After OM merged with the Helsinki Stock Exchange to form what is now OMX in 2003, the Stockholm and Helsinki exchanges' operations were merged. Since 2008, the Stockholm Stock Exchange has been part of Nasdaq, Inc. (formerly called Nasdaq OMX Group) and its Nasdaq Nordic markets. As of October 2014, the exchange operated under the legal name Nasdaq OMX Stockholm AB (renamed Nasdaq Stockholm AB in 2015).

Prior to the introduction of electronic trading on 1 June 1990, all trading was conducted on the floor of the Stockholm Stock Exchange Building.

Its normal trading sessions are from 09:00 to 17:30 on all days of the week except Saturdays, Sundays and holidays declared by the Exchange in advance.

Listed companies

See also
Stock market lists
List of stock exchanges
List of European stock exchanges
Nasdaq Nordic
Nasdaq Copenhagen
Nasdaq Helsinki
Nasdaq Vilnius
Nasdaq Riga
Nasdaq Tallinn
Nasdaq Iceland
Nasdaq First North

Other lists
List of companies of Sweden
List of largest Swedish companies
List of largest Nordic companies
List of Ålandic companies

References

External links
Official Website

Economy of Stockholm
Finance in Sweden
Stock exchanges in Europe
Business organizations based in Sweden
Stockholm
Nasdaq Nordic
Swedish companies established in 1863
Companies based in Stockholm
Financial services companies established in 1863
1998 mergers and acquisitions
2003 mergers and acquisitions
2008 mergers and acquisitions